Ion Vélez Martínez (born 17 February 1985) is a Spanish professional footballer who plays for Peña Sport FC as a forward.

Club career
Vélez was born in Tafalla, Navarre. Bought by Athletic Bilbao from lowly Peña Sport FC in 2003, he spent time with the club's B and feeder teams, subsequently being loaned to neighbours Barakaldo CF in Segunda División B. He made his debut for the main squad of the latter on 26 August 2007, in the goalless La Liga home draw against CA Osasuna.

After spending the second part of the 2007–08 season on loan to Segunda División's Hércules CF, where he appeared significantly – after his debut with the Alicante side, he managed to play, in the same season, in the three major levels of Spanish football – Vélez was definitely promoted to Athletic's first team for 2008–09. He was regularly played during the league campaign (28 matches, although only four complete) and, on 9 May 2009, scored the game's only goal as the Basques defeated Real Betis at home.

Vélez made only five official appearances for Athletic during the first part of 2010–11, all as a second-half substitute. On 19 January 2011 he moved to CD Numancia from division two on loan, reuniting with former Athletic teammate – and namesake – Iñigo Vélez. In late July, after being deemed surplus to requirements by new manager Marcelo Bielsa, he terminated his contract at the San Mamés Stadium and signed for Girona FC of the same tier, with his former club having a rebuying option at the end of the 2011–12 season.

On 3 October 2011, during an away league fixture against Xerez CD, Velez collided with opponent goalkeeper Toni Doblas, suffering an extremely serious injury to his right knee which sidelined him for the rest of the campaign. In July 2013 he signed with Deportivo Alavés, recently promoted to the second division.

Vélez agreed to a one-year deal with fellow league team CD Mirandés on 13 July 2015. He returned to the third tier prior to the start of 2016–17, joining CD Tudelano.

In November 2017, following a match against his former club Mirandés where he was sent off for kicking an opponent, Vélez was banned for four games. Upon appeal, it was later reduced to two.

On 24 June 2019, the 34-year-old Vélez returned to Peña Sport.

References

External links

1985 births
Living people
People from Tafalla (comarca)
Spanish footballers
Footballers from Navarre
Association football forwards
La Liga players
Segunda División players
Segunda División B players
Tercera División players
CD Basconia footballers
Bilbao Athletic footballers
Barakaldo CF footballers
Athletic Bilbao footballers
Hércules CF players
CD Numancia players
Girona FC players
Deportivo Alavés players
CD Mirandés footballers
CD Tudelano footballers
Peña Sport FC footballers